Hurtful communication occurs when the receiver perceives a specific social interaction as upsetting or harmful emotionally. In the course of human interaction, one party will say or do something that results in unpleasant emotional feelings for another. Negative social interactions can be intentional, when one or both parties are involved in interpersonal conflict, or unintentional, such as when misunderstandings occur. Actions such as failure to recognize accomplishments or significant dates can cause hurtful outcomes within relationships.  

Hurtful communication more commonly occurs in intimate relationships where parties have disclosed more information to one another than stranger interaction. Hurtful communication has been studied in romantic relationship and parent-child relationships, with findings having potential applications in sibling relationships, in-law relationships, work relationships, educator-student relationships, and friendships. In relation to other negative emotions such as anger or guilt, hurt is more often linked to interpersonal interaction. Interactions are adversely affected by hurtful communication. Hurtful communication negatively affects trust within a relationship resulting in more defensive behavior by both parties. Hurtful communication topics can be found interpersonal communication and relational communication research.

Defining hurtful communication 
Types of hurtful verbal communications and actions:

 Devaluationthe perception that one is not as close as thought. This can be a result of verbal or non-verbal communication where one party feels less important than they desire within the exchange. Often, devaluation is manifest through betrayal and/or rejection.
Relational transgressionsthe violation of relationship norms which causes one party to feel betrayal.
 Hurtful messages – words that result in pain. Commonly these messages are combinations of profanity, threats or attacks on appearance, competencies, origins or character. 
Both the content of the message and the delivery play a part in how a hurtful message is interpreted.  Content that provides new information to the recipient is considered more sensitive and better received than content that insults the person's intelligence.  In terms of delivery, hurtful communication packaged in the form of giving unsolicited advice may be seen as more supportive than the same information in the form of giving orders.

Factors such as whether the hurtful communication was intentional and the frequency of occurrence has an impact on the meaning of the event. Types of hurtful communication include relational denigration, humiliation, aggression, intrinsic flaw, shock, tasteless humor, misunderstood intent, and discouragement as probable causes of hurt feelings. Hurtful communication is interaction that causes the receiver to feel marginalized. 

The injured party most often is harmed by the undermining of self-concept causing loss of self-worth resulting in estrangement within the relationship, as receivers have difficulty trusting themselves and the one who engaged in hurtful communication.

Use of hurtful communication 
Communication is not exclusively a sender/receiver exchange of finite information. What is communicated through verbal and nonverbal communication is interpreted by both parties through a lens of schema of previous experiences and knowledge. Rather than scholarly research defining phrases and terms that universally are considered hurtful, researchers focus on what communication causes negative feelings in the receiver. Expressions of honest feelings by one party can be devastating to the other such as professions of attraction to another person or expressing disinterest in continuing a romantic relationship. A child displaying disinterest in a parent's involvement could be considered hurtful communication just as a parent criticism could be hurtful to an adolescent. In less familiar relationships such as acquaintances or strangers, hurtful communication is more general and typically focused on observations such as gender, race, sexual orientation or identity, ethnicity, national origin, or religion often in the form of verbal slurs and hate words. The more familiar the relationship becomes, the more specific and personal hurtful communication potential.

Responses to hurtful communication 
Guerrero, Anderson & Afifi (2010) noted three ways people react and respond to hurtful communication:

 Active verbal responses- Verbally confronting the offending party.
 Acquiescent responses- Acknowledging the offender's ability to inflict pain and surrendering. This action includes forgiveness.
 Invulnerable responses- Avoidance of acceptance of a hurtful message often deflected through humor or ignoring. Rumination (over-focusing on the occurrence rather than solutions) may prevent one from moving past the infraction.

It is probable that one or more (even all three) responses occur in when someone is faced with hurtful communication. In cases where the injured party perceived the hurtful communication intentional relational distancing often occurred which complicates resolution.

Application 
Hurtful communication studies fall under relational communications which is an interdisciplinary subject with connections to psychology, sociology, and communication fields. Researchers have produced various studies over past two decades relating to hurtful communication.

Romantic relationships 
Scholarly research on the topic of hurtful communication in romantic relationships is more readily available than any other category. Romantic partners use communication to construct and evolve their relationship or as a means to sabotage stability. Partners rate their relationships based on the current communication (whether positive or negative). Perhaps due to the closeness and interdependency of romantic relationships, communication between romantic partners that is deemed hurtful has significant impact on current and future interaction. Young, Bippus, & Dunbar (2015) state the intimate knowledge of the significant other's hopes, fears and insecurities enable each party to inflict pain more deeply than others in one's life. Intimate knowledge of all aspects of another's life gives access that can be used both positively and negatively. In conflict interaction, observations from one's partner may be processed differently than a non-conflict interaction. 

Self-uncertainty often occurs after a negative exchange rather than partner-uncertainty. When both self-uncertainty and partner-uncertainty occur the relationship status is called into question. Malachowski et al., (2015) found when self-uncertainty or partner-uncertainty occurred, it was more likely the parties would engage in forgiveness after a hurtful communication event theorizing it was part of the coping mechanism to reduce relationship-uncertainty.

Parent–child relationships 
The parent–child relationship is to some degree involuntary but both parties develop communication that provides the structure for the relationship. Relationships between parent and child is a deeply connected bond that evolves over time where familiarity and the changing dynamics can result in hurtful communications. The responsibility of parents to nurture their offspring has been theorized to result in more hurt feelings for the parents than the child when hurtful communications occur. While adolescence also feel pain from hurtful communications, adolescence may be less likely to verbalize their feelings perhaps due to the parent-child dependence that exists. Perceived rejection or betrayal between parent-child results in doubts of self, other and relationship as questioning of honesty, intimacy and closeness often occurs. Self-identity and family-identity is unstable when hurtful communication has or is occurring because eventually communication will be impaired. Since the attachment between parent and child differs from that of a romantic relationship, there is a difference in how hurtful communication is processed.

See also 

 Setting boundaries

References

Further reading
Fisher, D., Frey, N., & Smith, D. (2016). After sticks, stones, and hurtful words. Educational Leadership, 74(3), 54–58.
Hesse, C., Rauscher, E. A., Roberts, J. B., & Ortega, S. R. (2014). Investigating the Role of Hurtful Family Environment in the Relationship Between Affectionate Communication and Family Satisfaction. JOURNAL OF FAMILY COMMUNICATION, (2), 112. 
McLauren, R.M. & Sillars, A.L. (2014, October 1). Talking about hurtful communication in the family. National Communication Association. https://www.natcom.org/communication-currents/talking-about-hurtful-communication-family

Communication